Mount Jensen is a peak over  high, just north of First Facet in the Gonville and Caius Range of Victoria Land, Antarctica. It was mapped and named by the British Antarctic Expedition, 1910–13.

References

Mountains of Victoria Land
Scott Coast